The 2010–11 Louisville Cardinals men's basketball team represented the University of Louisville during the 2010–11 NCAA Division I men's basketball season, Louisville's 97th season of intercollegiate competition. The Cardinals competed in the Big East Conference and were coached by Rick Pitino, who was in his 10th season. The team played its home games on Denny Crum Court at the KFC Yum! Center, their first season at the new arena after 54 years at Freedom Hall.

The team finished the season 25–10, 12–6 in Big East play (3rd-T) and lost in the championship game of the 2011 Big East men's basketball tournament to Connecticut. They received an at-large bid and a #4 seed in the 2011 NCAA Division I men's basketball tournament where they were upset in the second round by #13 seeded Morehead State.

Preseason

Departures

Class of 2010 signees

Roster

Schedule

|-
!colspan=12| Exhibition

|-
!colspan=12| Non-conference regular season

|-
!colspan=12| Big East Regular Season

|-
!colspan=12| 2011 Big East tournament

|-
!colspan=12| 2011 NCAA tournament

References

Louisville Cardinals Men's Basketball Team, 2010-11
Louisville Cardinals men's basketball seasons
Louisville
Louisville Cardinals men's basketball, 2010-11
Louisville Cardinals men's basketball, 2010-11